The year 1722 in music involved some significant events.

Events
Tomaso Albinoni becomes opera director to the Elector of Bavaria.
André Campra becomes vice-maitre-de-chapelle of the Chapelle Royale at Versailles.
In a staged quarrel, Francesco Maria Veracini comes into conflict with Johann David Heinichen and the singer Senesino, ending with his leaping from a third storey window. He will walk with a limp for the rest of his life.
Johann Friedrich Fasch is appointed Kapellmeister at Zerbst, where he will remain for the rest of his life.
Johann Sebastian Bach produces the first of his Notebooks for Anna Magdalena Bach.
Jean-Philippe Rameau publishes the Traité de l'harmonie réduite à ses principes naturels.

Classical music
Tomaso Albinoni – Concertos à cinque, Op. 9 (published)
Johann Sebastian Bach
Das wohltemperierte Klavier, vol 1
Giovanni Bononcini – Divertimenti da camera
François Couperin – Pièces de clavecin, Book 3
Jan Dismas Zelenka – Trio Sonatas (6) for 2 Oboes, Bassoon and Basso Continuo

Opera
Carlo Arrigoni – La vedova
Baldassare Galuppi – La fede nell'incostanza ossia gli amici rivali
Nicola Porpora – Gli Orti Esperidi (libretto by Metastasio)
Leonardo Vinci – Le Zite 'n Calera

Births
January 18 – Antonio Rodríguez de Hita, composer (d. 1787)
January 28 – Johann Ernst Bach II, composer (d. 1777)
June 30 – Jiří Antonín Benda, composer (d. 1795)
October 2 – Leopold Widhalm, luthier
December 3 – Hryhorii Skovoroda, poet, philosopher and composer (d. 1794)
probable – Francis Hutcheson, songwriter (died 1773)

Deaths
April 16 – Johann Jacob Bach, musician and composer (b. 1682)
June 5 – Johann Kuhnau, composer (born 1660)
July 11 – Johann Joseph Vilsmayr, violinist and composer (b. 1663)
November 24 – Johann Adam Reincken, organist (born 1623)
date unknown – Antonio Tarsia, composer (b. 1643)

 
18th century in music
Music by year